Alessandro Francesco Tommaso Antonio Manzoni (7 March 1785 – 22 May 1873) was an Italian poet, novelist and philosopher. He is famous for the novel The Betrothed (orig. ) (1827), generally ranked among the masterpieces of world literature. The novel is also a symbol of the Italian Risorgimento, both for its patriotic message and because it was a fundamental milestone in the development of the modern, unified Italian language. Manzoni also contributed to the stabilization of the modern Italian language and helped to ensure linguistic unity throughout Italy. He was an influential proponent of Liberal Catholicism in Italy. His work and thinking has often been contrasted with that of his younger contemporary Giacomo Leopardi by critics.

Early life
Manzoni was born in Milan, Italy, on 7 March 1785. Pietro, his father, aged about fifty, belonged to an old family of Lecco, originally feudal lords of Barzio, in the Valsassina. The poet's maternal grandfather, Cesare Beccaria, was a well-known author and philosopher, and his mother Giulia had literary talent as well. The young Alessandro spent his first two years in cascina Costa in Galbiate and he was wet-nursed by Caterina Panzeri, as attested by a memorial tablet affixed in the place. In 1792 his parents broke their marriage and his mother began a relationship with the writer Carlo Imbonati, moving to England and later to Paris. For this reason, Alessandro was brought up in several religious institutions.

Manzoni was a slow developer, and at the various colleges he attended he was considered a dunce. At fifteen, however, he developed a passion for poetry and wrote two sonnets of considerable merit. Upon the death of his father in 1807, he joined the freethinking household of his mother at Auteuil, and spent two years mixing with the literary set of the so-called "ideologues", philosophers of the 18th-century school, among whom he made many friends, notably Claude Charles Fauriel. At Auteuil, he developed a lifelong interest in liberalism. He was even supposed to marry the daughter of Antoine Destutt de Tracy. There too he imbibed the anti-Catholic creed of Voltairianism.

In 1806–1807, while at Auteuil, he first appeared before the public as a poet, with two works, one entitled Urania, in the classical style, of which he became later the most conspicuous adversary, the other an elegy in blank verse, on the death of Count Carlo Imbonati, from whom, through his mother, he inherited considerable property, including the villa of Brusuglio, thenceforth his principal residence.

1808–1821
In 1808, Manzoni married Henriette Blondel, daughter of a Genevese banker. She came from a Calvinist family, but in 1810 she became a Roman Catholic. Her conversion profoundly influenced her husband. That same year he experienced a religious crisis which led him from Jansenism to an austere form of Catholicism. Manzoni's marriage proved a happy one, and he led for many years a retired domestic life, divided between literature and the picturesque husbandry of Lombardy.

His intellectual energy in this period of his life was devoted to the composition of the Inni sacri, a series of sacred lyrics, and of a treatise on Catholic morality, Osservazioni sulla morale cattolica, a task undertaken under religious guidance, in reparation for his early lapse from faith. In 1818 he had to sell his paternal inheritance, as his money had been lost to a dishonest agent. His characteristic generosity was shown at this time in his dealings with his peasants, who were heavily indebted to him. He not only cancelled on the spot the record of all sums owed to him, but bade them keep for themselves the whole of the coming maize harvest.

In 1819, Manzoni published his first tragedy, Il Conte di Carmagnola, which, boldly violating all classical conventions, excited a lively controversy. It was severely criticized in a Quarterly Review article to which Goethe replied in its defence, "one genius," as Count de Gubernatis remarks, "having divined the other." The death of Napoleon in 1821 inspired Manzoni's powerful stanzas Il Cinque maggio (The Fifth of May), one of the most popular lyrics in the Italian language. The political events of that year, and the imprisonment of many of his friends, weighed much on Manzoni's mind, and the historical studies in which he sought distraction during his subsequent retirement at Brusuglio suggested his great work.

The Betrothed

Round the episode of the Innominato, historically identified with Bernardino Visconti, the first manuscript of the novel The Betrothed (in Italian I promessi sposi) began to grow into shape, and was completed in September 1823. The work was published, after being deeply reshaped by the author and revised by friends in 1825–1827, at the rate of a volume a year; it at once raised its author to the first rank of literary fame. It is generally agreed to be his greatest work, and the paradigm of modern Italian language.
The Penguin Companion to European Literature notes that 'the book's real greatness lies in its delineation of character...in the heroine, Lucia, in Padre Cristoforo, the Capuchin friar, and the saintly cardinal (Borromeo) of Milan, he has created three living examples of that pure and wholehearted Christianity which is his ideal. But his psychological penetration extends also to those who fall short of this standard, whether through weakness or perversity, and the novel is rich in pictures of ordinary men and women, seen with a delightful irony and disenchantment which always stops short of cynicism, and which provides a perfect balance for the evangelical fervour of his ideal'.
In 1822, Manzoni published his second tragedy, Adelchi, turning on the overthrow by Charlemagne of the Lombard domination in Italy, and containing many veiled allusions to the existing Austrian rule. With these works Manzoni's literary career was practically closed. But he laboriously revised The Betrothed in Tuscan-Italian, and in 1840 republished it in that form, with a historical essay, Storia della colonna infame, on details of the 17th-century plague in Milan so important in the novel. He also wrote a small treatise on the Italian language.

Politics and economics
Manzoni favored the Italian unification and was even a member of the Italian Senate. Before and after his embracing an austere Catholicism upon marrying Henriett Blondel, Manzoni's politics can be broadly described as liberal. Since his French trip, Manzoni's liberalism included a profound understanding of economics. He was well acquainted with authors such as Jean-Baptiste Say and Adam Smith and left numerous notes on the economic treatises and essays he was reading.

His understanding of economics came to surface in his grand historical novel The Betrothed, particularly in Chapter 12, where he deals with the famine in Lombardy. Economist and President of the Italian Republic Luigi Einaudi praised the chapter and the whole of The Betrothed as "one of the best treatises on political economy ever written”. Economic historian Deirdre N. McCloskey likewise described it as "a lecture in Economics 101”.

Family, death and legacy

The death of Manzoni's wife in 1833 was preceded and followed by those of several of his children, and of his mother. In the mid-1830s he attended the "Salotto Maffei", a salon in Milan hosted by Clara Maffei, and in 1837 he married again, to Teresa Borri, widow of Count Stampa. Teresa also died before him, while of nine children born to him in his two marriages all but two pre-deceased him. In 1860 King Victor Emmanuel II named him a senator. The death of his eldest son, Pier Luigi, on 28 April 1873, was the final blow which hastened his end. He was already weakened as he had fallen on 6 January while exiting the San Fedele church, hitting his head on the steps, and he died after 5 months of cerebral meningitis, a complication of the trauma. His funeral was celebrated in the Milan Cathedral with almost royal pomp. His remains, after they lay in state for some days, were followed to the Cimitero Monumentale in Milan by a vast cortege, including the royal princes and all the great officers of state, but his noblest monument was Giuseppe Verdi's Requiem, written to honour his memory. In modern times, he has been honored twice with a Google Doodle.

His Osservazioni sulla morale cattolica was quoted by Pope Pius XI in his encyclical on Christian Education Divini Illius Magistri: "20. It is worthy of note how a layman, an excellent writer and at the same time a profound and conscientious thinker, has been able to understand well and express exactly this fundamental Catholic doctrine: 'The Church does not say that morality belongs purely, in the sense of exclusively, to her; but that it belongs wholly to her. She has never maintained that outside her fold and apart from her teaching, man cannot arrive at any moral truth; she has on the contrary more than once condemned this opinion because it has appeared under more forms than one. She does however say, has said, and will ever say, that because of her institution by Jesus Christ, because of the Holy Ghost sent her in His name by the Father, she alone possesses what she has had immediately from God and can never lose, the whole of moral truth, omnem veritatem, in which all individual moral truths are included, as well those which man may learn by the help of reason, as those which form part of revelation or which may be deduced from it'".

References

External links
 
 
 
 
 

 
1785 births
1873 deaths
Writers from Milan
19th-century Italian novelists
Burials at the Cimitero Monumentale di Milano
Deaths from meningitis
Neurological disease deaths in Lombardy
Infectious disease deaths in Lombardy
Italian male novelists
Italian Roman Catholics
Converts to Roman Catholicism from atheism or agnosticism
19th-century Italian poets
Italian male poets
Members of the Senate of the Kingdom of Italy
Writers from Lombardy
Western Lombard language
19th-century Italian male writers
Recipients of the Pour le Mérite (civil class)
Liberal Catholicism